Sophie Lamon (born 8 February 1985) is a Swiss former fencer. She won a silver medal in the women's team épée event at the 2000 Summer Olympics.

References

External links
 

1985 births
Living people
Swiss female épée fencers
Olympic fencers of Switzerland
Fencers at the 2000 Summer Olympics
Fencers at the 2008 Summer Olympics
Olympic silver medalists for Switzerland
Olympic medalists in fencing
People from Sion, Switzerland
Medalists at the 2000 Summer Olympics
Sportspeople from Valais